Richard Alfred Wallace (June 3, 1861 – March 12, 1935) was a Canadian teacher, cook, farmer and politician on the municipal and territorial level.

Wallace ran in his first election in the 1898 Northwest Territories general election. He defeated four other candidates in a closely contested election winning just over 38% of the vote to capture the High River electoral district.

He was re-elected with nearly 70% of the vote in the 1902 Northwest Territories general election.

He ran for re-election in 1905 but was not successful.

References

1861 births
1935 deaths
Members of the Legislative Assembly of the Northwest Territories
Mayors of places in Alberta